Tamer Tuna (born 1 July 1976) is a Turkish football coach and a former player.

Career

Honours

Player honours
Beşiktaş
Süper Lig (1): 2002–03

Managerial honours
Dardanelspor
TFF Third League Play-off winner (1): 2012–13

Managerial statistics

References

External links

1976 births
People from Hanak
Living people
Turkish footballers
Turkey international footballers
Denizlispor footballers
Dardanelspor footballers
Trabzonspor footballers
Beşiktaş J.K. footballers
Bursaspor footballers
FC Akhmat Grozny players
Russian Premier League players
Turkish expatriate footballers
Expatriate footballers in Russia
Samsunspor footballers
Turanspor footballers
Gaziantepspor footballers
İstanbulspor footballers
Turkish football managers
Association football midfielders